Michael Anderson Pereira da Silva (born February 16, 1983 in São Caetano do Sul) better known as simply Michael, is a professional Brazilian football player.

Career
Michael started his professional career in Santo André, and soon moved to Cruzeiro, however after 1 season he moved to São Paulo playing for Palmeiras. After two seasons with Palmeiras in July 2007, Michael signed a 3-year deal with Ukrainian club Dynamo Kyiv.

Michael debuted for Dynamo on 22 July against Arsenal Kyiv and managed to score a double in his debut.UPL Round 2 Silva made his UEFA Champions League debut in a group stage game against Italian team Roma. Most of the autumn and winter 2007 Michael was injured and was undergoing treatment in Brazil, however he has recovered and returned since. On 13 May 2009 the 26-year-old attacking midfield player, changes on loan until 31 December 2009 from Dynamo Kyiv to Botafogo.

Michael moved from Kyiv to Portuguesa on 23 May 2011.

Flamengo career statistics
(Correct )

according to combined sources on the Flamengo official website and Flaestatística.

References

External links
  Michael's profile at Dynamo's official website
  sambafoot
  zerozero.pt
  Michael adds depth to Dynamo

1983 births
Living people
People from São Caetano do Sul
Brazilian footballers
Brazilian expatriate footballers
Expatriate footballers in Ukraine
Cruzeiro Esporte Clube players
Sociedade Esportiva Palmeiras players
FC Dynamo Kyiv players
Santos FC players
Botafogo de Futebol e Regatas players
CR Flamengo footballers
Associação Portuguesa de Desportos players
Campeonato Brasileiro Série A players
Ukrainian Premier League players
Brazilian expatriate sportspeople in Ukraine
Rio Preto Esporte Clube players
Esporte Clube Santo André players
Volta Redonda FC players
Association football wingers
Footballers from São Paulo (state)